The women's national basketball team of the Bhutan represents the country in women's basketball in international tournaments.

First formed around September 2015 through try-outs, The national team was set to make its debut in an international tournament at the 2016 South Asian Games and was to be led by head coach Mike Behnke, but the basketball event was cancelled.

Competitions

FIBA Asia Championship
yet to qualify

SABA Championship
2002-2015 : Did Not Participate

South Asian Games
1995-2010 : Did Not Participate
2016 : Event Cancelled

Coaches
 Mike Behnke (2015–2016)

References

External links
FIBA Profile

Basketball in Bhutan
Bhutan
Basketball women
Basketball teams in Bhutan